The frontonasal duct is a communication between the frontal air sinuses and their corresponding nasal cavity. The duct is lined by mucous membrane. The duct empties into the nasal cavity middle nasal meatus through the infundibulum of the semilunar hiatus.

Bones of the head and neck